Jordan Vandenberg (born 25 March 1990) is an Australian professional basketball player for the McKinnon Cougars of the Big V. He played four seasons of college basketball for North Carolina State University. He also holds a Dutch passport because of his father. He also has a famous brother called Taylor Vandenberg who plays down at the Waverley Basketball Association

Early life
Born in Melbourne, Vandenberg played junior basketball for the Waverley Falcons and attended Box Hill Senior Secondary College. In 2008, he accepted a basketball scholarship at the Australian Institute of Sport (AIS) where he went on to represent Australia at the Albert Schweitzer Tournament. He also played 17 games for the AIS during the 2008 SEABL season. In those 17 games, he averaged 2.0 points and 2.1 rebounds per game.

In April 2009, Vandenberg committed to play college basketball for North Carolina State.

College career
Vandenberg played five seasons (2009–14) for the NC State Wolfpack after being granted a medical redshirt during his junior season. He averaged 4.6 points, on 68% shooting, with 4.7 rebounds and 1.4 blocks over 22.3 minutes in 32 games (all starts) his senior season.

Professional career
After going undrafted in the 2014 NBA draft, Vandenberg joined the New York Knicks for the 2014 NBA Summer League. On 23 October 2014, he signed with the Knicks, only to be waived by the team two days later. On 3 November 2014, he was acquired by the Westchester Knicks of the NBA Development League as an affiliate player of New York. On 23 December 2014, he was waived by Westchester after appearing in nine games.

On 4 March 2015, Vandenberg signed with the Bendigo Braves for the 2015 SEABL season. In 27 games for the Braves, he averaged 5.4 points and 4.6 rebounds per game.

On 7 January 2016, Vandenberg signed with the Sydney Kings as an injury replacement for Julian Khazzouh, joining the team for the rest of the 2015–16 NBL season. He appeared in eight games for the Kings, averaging 3.1 points and 1.6 rebounds per game.

On 29 March 2016, Vandenberg signed with the Sandringham Sabres of the 2016 SEABL season. In 24 games for the Sabres, he averaged 8.3 points and 6.6 rebounds per game.

On 27 October 2016, Vandenberg signed with Japanese team Nishinomiya Storks. In 53 games for Nishinomiya in 2016–17, he averaged 9.7 points, 9.1 rebounds, 1.2 assists and 1.6 blocks per game. He returned to Nishinomiya for the 2017–18 season before joining Kumamoto Volters in January 2018.

In April 2019, Vandenberg joined the Southern Huskies for the 2019 New Zealand NBL season. In 18 games, he averaged 5.1 points and 4.4 rebounds per game.

In March 2021, Vandenberg signed with the McKinnon Cougars for the 2021 Big V season. He re-signed with McKinnon in March 2022.

Personal
Vandenberg is the son of Peter and Catherine Vandenberg, and has four siblings. One of his younger sisters, Jacinta, plays college basketball for the University of Oregon.

References

External links
NC State bio
D-League stats
Japan League stats

1990 births
Living people
Australian expatriate basketball people in Japan
Australian expatriate basketball people in New Zealand
Australian expatriate basketball people in the United States
Australian Institute of Sport basketball players
Australian men's basketball players
Basketball players from Melbourne
Centers (basketball)
Kumamoto Volters players
NC State Wolfpack men's basketball players
Nishinomiya Storks players
Southern Huskies players
Sydney Kings players
Westchester Knicks players